Horseshoe Lake is a lake in Isanti County, in the U.S. state of Minnesota.

Horseshoe Lake was so named on account of its outline being in the shape of a horseshoe.

See also
List of lakes in Minnesota

References

Lakes of Minnesota
Lakes of Isanti County, Minnesota